Karl David Reinhold Myrbäck, (7 September 1900 – 1 July 1986), was a Swedish chemist.

Myrbäck graduated with a Ph.D. degree in 1927 from Stockholms högskola with a thesis on enzyme chemistry. He became Docent of biochemistry in 1926, and Laborator at the Department of Biochemistry at Stockholms högskola in 1928. He was appointed professor of fermentation chemistry at Stockholms högskola in 1932, and of organic chemistry and biochemistry in 1947. Between 1963 and 1967, he was professor of biochemistry at Stockholm University. He was elected to both the Royal Swedish Academy of Sciences and the Royal Swedish Academy of Engineering Sciences in 1943, and acted subsequently as Deputy Secretary of the Royal Swedish Academy of Engineering Sciences. Myrbäck became editor-in-chief of the scientific journal Acta Chemica Scandinavica in 1947.

Family 
Karl Myrbäck was son of editor Herman Myrbäck and Helena, née Lundgren. In 1927, he married Signe Karlsson (1900–1983), daughter of restaurant keeper Alfred Karlsson and Hilda, née Wester.

Sources 
Vem är det : Svensk biografisk handbok 1975, Eva Löwgren (Ed.), P. A. Norstedt & Söners Förlag, Stockholm 1974  p. 719

References 

Swedish chemists
Members of the Royal Swedish Academy of Sciences
Members of the Royal Swedish Academy of Engineering Sciences
1900 births
1986 deaths
20th-century Swedish people